USNS Apalachicola (T-EPF-13) is the thirteenth  and operated by the United States Navys Military Sealift Command. It is the second ship in naval service named after Apalachicola, Florida.

Austal USA has secured a contract from the US Department of Defense to carry out the detailed design, procurement, production implementation, and demonstration of autonomous capability in Expeditionary Fast Transport (EPF) vessel 13 Apalachicola.

References

 

Transports of the United States Navy
Ships built in Mobile, Alabama
Spearhead-class Joint High Speed Vessels